The State of Slovenes, Croats and Serbs ( /) was a political entity that was constituted in October 1918, at the end of World War I, by Slovenes, Croats and Serbs (Prečani) residing in what were the southernmost parts of the Austro-Hungarian Empire. Although internationally unrecognised, this was the first incarnation of a Yugoslav state founded on the Pan-Slavic ideology. Thirty-three days after it was proclaimed, the state joined the Kingdom of Serbia and the Kingdom of Montenegro to form the Kingdom of Serbs, Croats and Slovenes.

Name 
The state's name derives from the three main South Slavic ethnic groups that inhabited it: the Slovenes, Croats, and Serbs.

The Croats identified in the name were those residing in the preceding kingdoms of Croatia-Slavonia, Bosnia and Herzegovina and Dalmatia (including Boka Kotorska).

The Serbs identified in the name were those residing in Bosnia and Herzegovina, Croatia-Slavonia, Dalmatia (including Boka Kotorska and Montenegrin Littoral), not those residing in the Kingdom of Serbia (which included the territory of the present-day North Macedonia), nor those living in the Kingdom of Montenegro or Vojvodina (including Banat, Bačka, Baranya).

The Slovenes identified in the name were the residents of the Duchy of Carniola, Duchy of Styria, Duchy of Carinthia and Prekmurje.

Creation

Background 

In 1918, the final year of the War, the Austro-Hungarian monarchy was suffering from an internal crisis accompanied by unrest amongst the multiple Slavic peoples within its borders. The South Slavic peoples were divided between various subdivisions of the monarchy:
 Cisleithania: The Austrian Littoral, Duchy of Carniola and the Kingdom of Dalmatia were under Austrian jurisdiction. The neighbouring duchies of Styria and the Carinthia also included a significant South Slavic population.
 Transleithania: The Kingdom of Croatia-Slavonia and Fiume (corpus separatum) were under Hungarian jurisdiction. The Kingdom of Hungary itself included a significant South Slavic populations in Prekmurje, Međimurje, Baranja and territories that had been part of the Voivodeship of Serbia and Banat of Temeschwar.
 The Austro-Hungarian Condominium of Bosnia and Herzegovina.

Activities of the pro-Yugoslav forces in the Transleithanian Kingdom of Croatia-Slavonia on 30 May 1917 resulted in adoption of the May Declaration by the Yugoslav Club, a group of Croatian and Slovene deputies in the Reichsrat (the legislature of Cisleithania in Vienna). The Declaration sought the unification of all the lands in the Habsburg monarchy populated by Slovenes, Croats, and Serbs in one independent entity.

On 2–3 March 1918, a grass-roots meeting was held in Zagreb that included representatives of various aspects of public life as well as members of several political parties, primarily the Mile Starčević faction of the Party of Rights led by Ante Pavelić and the Slovene People's Party. The ruling Croat-Serb Coalition and its opposition the Croatian People's Peasant Party, however, were excluded. The meeting produced the Zagreb Resolution that proclaimed the unity of the people of Slovenes, Croats and Serbs (a "unified nation" with the latter described as equal "tribes" whose peculiar historical positions and desires are to be accommodated), demanded a right of self-determination and possession of the territory they occupied, including the whole of Cisleithania.

In July and August 1918, the so-called "People's organizations of Slovenes, Croats and Serbs" were formed in Split (for Dalmatia), Sušak (for the Croatian Littoral) and Ljubljana (for the Slovene lands) to advance these policies. In late August, the Croatia-Slavonia parties met again in Zagreb to discuss how to proceed and, in particular, how to gain the support of the Croat-Serb Coalition.

On 14 September 1918, Austro-Hungarian Foreign Minister Stephan Burián von Rajecz issued a statement advocating a settlement of World War I by peace treaty and it became apparent that the war was coming to an end. By early October, the Slovene-Croat-Serb movement were planning to set up a National Assembly. Svetozar Pribićević, the leader of the Croat-Serb Coalition, confronted Srđan Budisavljević, one of the leaders of this movement, in an effort to determine whether these plans were meant to undermine the Coalition, and the two reached an understanding whereby the Coalition would be invited to join any future National Council before a National Assembly was formed. At the same time, the organizers obtained support from the Croatian People's Peasant Party and the Serb People's Radical Party. On 5 and 6 October, a provisional assembly was convened and the formation of executive committees begun. Seats were apportioned to members of all parties, but not without acrimony over the ad hoc nature of the proceedings.

Establishment 

The People's Council was established on 5–8 October 1918 in Zagreb, pursuant to the decisions reached in March 1918. The Council declared itself a political representative body of Slovenes, Croats and Serbs living in Croatia-Slavonia, Fiume, Dalmatia, Bosnia and Herzegovina, Istria, Trieste, Carniola, Gorizia and Gradisca, Styria, Carinthia, Bačka, Banat, Baranya, Međimurje and elsewhere in southwest Hungary. The Council established its own Central Committee and Presidency, while one member of the Council was to be representative of a 100,000 people. In addition, it comprised five representatives of Croatian Sabor, the Diet of Bosnia and Reichsrat for a total of 95 representatives. 32 voting members were required to form the quorum, and two-thirds majority was needed for any decisions. Members of regional parliaments were allowed to attend as non-voting observers. The Council elected up to 30 Central Committee members, who could appoint a further 10 to the committee by a two-thirds vote.

The Kingdom of Hungary signed a truce with the Allies on 13 October 1918. Pavelić and others started negotiating with the Serbian envoy to the National Assembly Dušan T. Simović as soon as Simović had said that their military victory and the treaty with Hungary gave them right to most of the territory of the State of Slovenes, Croats and Serbs, whereas Pavelić said that they want unification with Serbia, but that they needed a federal state as well as a delineation of Croatian and Serbian population that would assume a population transfer. Simović rejected the talk of federalization and Pavelić yielded, and there was no further discussion on either issue.

On 14 October 1918, Austrian foreign minister Burián asked for an armistice based on the Fourteen Points outlined in January 1918 by American president Woodrow Wilson, whose Point 10 read: "The people of Austria-Hungary, whose place among the nations we wish to see safeguarded and assured, should be accorded the freest opportunity to autonomous development." Two days later, Emperor Karl issued a proclamation ("Imperial Manifesto of 16 October 1918"), which envisaged a significant modification the structure of the Empire by granting wide autonomy to its peoples, including federalization of Cisleithania. Karl's proposal was rejected on 18 October by U.S. Secretary of State Robert Lansing who said autonomy for the nationalities was no longer enough. On 19 October, the National Council declared itself the supreme representative body of all South-Slavic peoples in the monarchy.

On 21 and 22 October, members of the Pure Party of Rights who still advocated a trialist monarchy secured formal support for a trialist manifesto from Emperor Karl and Prime Minister Sándor Wekerle in Hungary, but the latter was deposed the next day.

Numerous mass rallies were held in Zagreb in support the Yugoslav cause, especially on 22 October. 

On 28 October, Gyula Andrássy the Younger sent a peace note to the American government while the Ban of Croatia, Antun Mihalović, reported to the Emperor and was dismissed with the instruction "Do as you please". The Ministry of War had also decided to allow the local military commands to approach the people's councils in order to help maintain law and order. All this was taken as a sign that the Austro-Hungarian monarchy was disintegrating and that the State of Slovenes, Croats and Serbs was an attainable goal.

The state was proclaimed officially on 29 October 1918. Its first president was a Slovene, Anton Korošec. The two vice presidents were a Serb, Svetozar Pribićević, and a Croat, Ante Pavelić.

The new state aspired to include all those territories of the former Austria-Hungary that were inhabited by Slovenes, Croats and Serbs. Those representing the Serbs in Vojvodina, howeverincluding those in Banat, Bačka and Baranjaobjected and formed their own administration under the supreme authority of the Serbian National Board in Novi Sad. Vojvodina then joined the Kingdom of Serbia on 25 November 1918. One day earlier, on 24 November 1918, the region of Syrmia, which had become part of the State of Slovenes, Croats and Serbs, seceded and also joined the Kingdom of Serbia.

Conflict with Italy 

In order to avoid handing them to the Entente Powers, Emperor Karl assigned the entire Austro-Hungarian Navy, the Austro-Hungarian merchant fleet and all Austro-Hungarian harbours, arsenals and shore fortifications to the National Council. The National Council sent diplomatic notes to the Entente governments notifying them that they had taken control of these assets and were not at war. The fleet, however, was soon attacked and dismembered by the Italian navy, the Regia Marina.

Austria-Hungary reached an armistice with Italy through the Armistice of Villa Giusti signed on 4 November 1918. This agreement stipulated that Italy could occupy large parts of the territory that had been included in the State of Slovenes, Croats and Serbs. Italian troops then occupied Istria and much of Dalmatia and remained there until 1921, when the Treaty of Rapallo came into effect.

Creation of the Kingdom of Serbs, Croats, and Slovenes 

The State of Slovenes, Croats and Serbs did not obtain international diplomatic recognition before it ceased to exist. In a note of 31 October, the National Council informed the governments of the United Kingdom, France, Italy and the United States that the State of Slovenes, Croats and Serbs was constituted in the South-Slavic areas that had been part of Austria-Hungary, and that the new state intended to form a common state with Serbia and Montenegro. The same note was sent to the government of the Kingdom of Serbia and the Yugoslav Committee in London. Serbia's prime minister Nikola Pašić responded to the note on 8 November, recognizing the National Council in Zagreb as "legal government of Serbs, Croats and Slovenes living in the territory of the Austria-Hungary", and notified the governments of the United Kingdom, France, Italy and the United States asking them to do the same.

On 23–24 November, the National Council declared "unification of the State of Slovenes, Croats and Serbs formed on the entire, contiguous South-Slavic area of the former Austria-Hungary with the Kingdom of Serbia and Montenegro into a unified State of Slovenes, Croats and Serbs". 28 members of the council were appointed to implement that decision based on National Council's adopted directions on implementation of the agreement of organization of the unified state with the government of the Kingdom of Serbia and representatives of political parties in Serbia and Montenegro. The instructions were largely ignored by the delegation members who negotiated with Regent Alexander instead.

Stjepan Radić's Peasant Party participated in the National Council, but after it decided to merge with Serbia, they started to back off, calling the move foolish, and disputing the decision based on the fact that the Croatian Parliament never explicitly approved it.

On 1 December, Regent Alexander proclaimed unification of "Serbia with lands of the independent State of Slovenes, Croats and Serbs into a unified Kingdom of Serbs, Croats, and Slovenes". As the National Council ceased to operate, it never formally ratified the proclamation, nor did the Parliament of Serbia, which took note of the declaration on 29 December 1918.

The National Council's final important task was to appoint representatives to the Temporary National Representation in early 1919.

See also 
Geneva Declaration (1918)
Lipošćak affair
Podgorica Assembly
History of Yugoslavia
Verigar issue
Slovene March
Timeline of Croatian history

References

Sources

External links 

Država Slovenaca, Hrvata i Srba (1918) 
Map 

States succeeding Austria-Hungary
1918 in Croatia
1918 in Yugoslavia
1918 in Slovenia
1918 in Bosnia and Herzegovina
States and territories established in 1918
States and territories disestablished in 1918
1918 establishments in Europe
1918 disestablishments in Europe
Former countries of the interwar period
Yugoslavism
Provisional governments